In physics, the Rayleigh dissipation function, named after Lord Rayleigh, is a function used to handle the effects of velocity-proportional frictional forces in Lagrangian mechanics.

This function represents half of the rate of energy dissipation of the system through friction. The force of friction is negative the velocity gradient of the dissipation function, analogous to a force being equal to the negative position gradient of a potential. This relationship is represented in terms of the set of generalized coordinates  as 

.

As friction is not conservative, it is included in the  term of Lagrange's equations,

.
Applying of the value of the frictional force described by generalized coordinates into the Euler-Lagrange equations gives
.

References

Functions and mappings
Lagrangian mechanics